The Columbus Challenger is a professional tennis tournament played on hard courts. It is currently part of the ATP Challenger Tour and WTA 125K series. The ATP event is held annually in Columbus, Ohio, U.S.A, as it has been since 2015, the tournament's start. The women's edition started in 2021.

Past finals

Men's singles

Women's singles

Men's doubles

Women's doubles

See also
 Columbus Open

References

External links
Official website

ATP Challenger Tour
Hard court tennis tournaments in the United States
Recurring sporting events established in 2015